Phyllonorycter formosella is a moth of the family Gracillariidae. It is known from the Seychelles.

Taxonomy
The species was transferred to the family Glyphipterigidae by De Prins & De Prins in 2005.

References

formosella
Moths of Africa
Moths described in 1965